Perthida phoenicopa is a moth of the family Incurvariidae. It was described by Edward Meyrick in 1893, and is known from New South Wales and South Australia.

References

Moths described in 1893
Incurvariidae